Room on the Broom is a 2012 short stop motion computer animated television film based on the picture book written by Julia Donaldson and illustrated by Axel Scheffler. The film was nominated for the Best Animated Short Film at the 2014 Academy Awards. It also won the British Academy Children's Award for Animation in 2013.

Directed by Max Lang and Jan Lachauer, the film was produced by Martin Pope and Michael Rose of Magic Light Pictures, London, in association with Orange Eyes Limited.

It was first seen in theatres with Thor: The Dark World.  It was first broadcast on BBC One on Tuesday 25 December 2012 before being released on DVD in March 2013 by Magic Light Pictures. It then aired in the United States on PBS Kids Sprout as a Halloween special, on 30 October 2013, and then aired in the United States on PBS Kids as a Christmas special, on 1 December 2017 – 9 December 2018.

Voice cast
 Simon Pegg as the Narrator
 Gillian Anderson as the Witch
 Rob Brydon as the Cat
 Timothy Spall as the Dragon
 Martin Clunes as the Dog
 Sally Hawkins as the Bird
 David Walliams as the Frog

See also
 The Gruffalo
 The Gruffalo's Child

References

External links

2012 in British television
2012 television films
2012 films
2012 animated films
2012 short films
2010s animated short films
British animated short films
German animated short films
British television films
BBC Film films
Animated films based on children's books
Films about witchcraft
Donaldson and Scheffler
2010s English-language films
Films directed by Max Lang
2010s British films
2010s German films